Arjun Das is an Indian actor who works in Tamil films. Best known for his role as Anbu in the film Kaithi (2019), he has garnered major attention for his bass voice.

Arjun made his acting debut in the suspense thriller Perumaan (2012). Following a few other movies and short films, he appeared in Lokesh Kanagaraj's Kaithi, portraying the film's antagonist, a cocaine addict gang leader and then collaborated with Lokesh again for the film Master portraying Das, the film's secondary antagonist.

Early life 
The actor has stated in interviews that he quit a well-paying job as a banker in Dubai, before moving to Chennai for opportunities in cinema. Arjun remembers being overweight.

Career 

In 2012, he debuted in the independent film Perumaan. Regarding his role in the film, The Times of India stated that "Arjun makes a confident debut". After shooting for the Netflix-featured independent film and Atlee's debut venture, Andhaghaaram, Arjun Das worked with Radio One 94.3FM hosting the Drive show as a radio jockey. He cites this past occupation as a form of sustenance before entering the film industry, and has often  mentioned that this was where he first claimed a fan base for his voice. He has also portrayed Gopichand's brother in the Telugu movie, Oxygen (2017).

Scouted by Lokesh Kanagaraj for Kaithi, Arjun was initially hesitant to sign the film, due to the importance and substance of the character. After auditioning with a scene that didn't make it to the film's final cut, he landed a role as the main antagonist in the film. Quoting Dhanush as his inspiration, he claims that he is not the type to seriously prepare for any scene, however, he did conduct basic research to get into the skin of the character, with emphasis on the behaviour of drug use. He received abundant appreciation for his role and voice in Kaithi, following which he was once again roped in by Lokesh Kanagaraj for Master. Often attributing his talent and fame to Lokesh Kanagaraj, Arjun has expressed his gratefulness to him for the role of Das in Master, for which he was called a few days after the commencement of shoot. His piercing glares and iconic voice in the film set him aside from the rest of the varied cast, as he portrays a sub-antagonist role responsible for controlling the children of a juvenile centre with the influence of drugs.

His most recent release is the supernatural thriller, Andhaghaaram, in which he plays the lead role of Vinod, an alcoholic and smoke addict of a coach, guilt stricken of his friend's mental condition.

His upcoming films include Kumki 2, where he portrays a character with "shades of grey" and Dhruva Natchathiram, in which he lent his voice for the villain character. He will play the lead in an untitled film directed by Anwar Rasheed.

Filmography

As an actor

Films 
All films are in Tamil language unless otherwise noted.

Music video

As voice actor

Awards and nominations

References

External links 
 

Tamil actors
Male actors in Tamil cinema
Indian male actors
Living people
21st-century Indian actors
1992 births
Male actors in Telugu cinema
Indian male film actors
South Indian International Movie Awards winners